Kentucky Route 490 (KY 490) is a  state highway in Kentucky that runs from U.S. Route 25 southwest of East Bernstadt to U.S. Route 25 again in Livingston via East Bernstadt.

Major intersections

References

0490
Transportation in Laurel County, Kentucky
Transportation in Rockcastle County, Kentucky